Queen of the north or variation, may refer to:

Ships and boats
 , a RO-RO ferry launched in 1969 and sank in 2006, operated by BC Ferries, formerly Stena Danica
 , a steam ferry launched in 1929, also called Princess Norah, Canadian Prince, Beachcomber

Stage, film, television
 Margrete: Queen of the North, a 2021 Danish film
 "Queen of the North" (Canada's Drag Race), a 2021 episode of Canada's Drag Race

Other uses
 Queen of the North (Canada's Drag Race), the title for the winner of Canada's Drag Race

See also

 "Queen of the North Atlantic", the schooner Bluenose
 "Lonely Queen of the North", the battleship Tirpitz
 North (disambiguation)
 Queen (disambiguation)
 North queen (disambiguation)
 Northern queen (disambiguation)